Binod is a name in Bengali, Odia, Nepali and Bodo languages, which comes from the Sanskrit for "happiness" or "joy". 

Notable people with the name include:
Binod Bhandari (born 1990), Nepalese cricketer
Binod Bihari Chowdhury (1911–2013), Bangladeshi revolutionary
Binod Bihari Verma (1937–2003), Indian writer
Binod Chaudhary (born 1955), Nepalese businessman
Binod Das (born 1983), Nepalese cricketer
Binod Kanungo (1912–1990), Indian writer
Binod Pradhan (born 1973), Indian cinematographer
Binod Sethi (born 1957), Indian businessman
Binod Bhandari (born 1989), Nepalese cricketer

Indian given names
Nepalese given names